Lepidostephium is a genus of South African flowering plants in the family Asteraceae.

 Species
 Lepidostephium asteroides (Bolus & Schltr.) Kroner
 Lepidostephium denticulatum Oliv.

References

Gnaphalieae
Asteraceae genera
Endemic flora of South Africa
Taxa named by Daniel Oliver